"Tusa" is a song by Colombian singer-songwriter Karol G and Trinidadian-American rapper Nicki Minaj. It was written by Karol G, Minaj, Keityn and Ovy on the Drums, and produced by the latter.
The song was released on November 7, 2019 by Republic Records, Universal Music Latino and Universal Music Group, as the lead single from Karol G’s third studio album KG0516.

"Tusa" peaked at number 42 on the US Billboard Hot 100. It also became the first song by two lead female artists to debut at number one on the US Hot Latin Songs chart. As well, the song debuted at number 56 on the Rolling Stone Top 100, later peaking at number 41. The song peaked at number one in various Spanish-speaking countries and is the longest-running number-one single on the Argentina Hot 100, having spent 25 weeks at number one on the chart.

"Tusa" was nominated for two Latin Grammy Awards in the categories Record of the Year and Song of the Year. The song was certified in multiple countries, going onto become the highest certified song in Mexico by AMPROFON and the 9th highest certified song by the Latin RIAA, according to the database.

Background

The song was announced a day prior to its release through Karol G's social media platforms, with a snippet of the music video and release date. The song was officially released on November 7, 2019.

Karol G explained how the song came to be: "I took the initiative to reach out that I wanted to write a song with her, and she loved the idea. When the opportunity came to work with Nicki, it wasn't something I wasn't looking for at the time, destiny gave me that surprise. I had a list of English speaking artists that I always wanted to work with, but I felt that Nicki Minaj was still on a higher level to which I had to work a little bit more."

In an interview with Billboard Giraldo revealed how Nicki Minaj's verse came to be:

At a Pollstar conference, Minaj spoke on her part on "Tusa", stating: "She had sent me another song, and she really loved it, and I tried to write to it but I couldn't, and instead of brushing her off, finally was like 'You know what, I love you, but I don't like this song. Could you send me something else?' And she sent me 'Tusa'."

The word  is Colombian slang for someone's heartache and feeling of incapability to overcome their ex partner, accompanied by a desire for revenge. A person affected by this feeling is described as /.

Composition
"Tusa" is a reggaeton song that is three minutes and 20 seconds in length. It was written by the two artists alongside Keityn and Ovy on the Drums, with production being handled by the latter. Lyrically, Karol G's verses tell the story of a woman who struggles to forget her former boyfriend, while Minaj's rap tells the man that the woman has moved on with her life.

Commercial performance
In the United States, "Tusa" debuted at number one on the Hot Latin Songs, becoming the first song by two lead female artists to debut atop the chart, and also the first song by a female act in a lead role to chart at number one since 2016, when Shakira's "Chantaje" featuring Maluma reached the top. It became Minaj's sixth entry on the Hot Latin Songs chart, and her second top 10, following 2017's "Krippy Kush" remix with Farruko, Bad Bunny, 21 Savage and Rvssian.

On the US Billboard Hot 100, the song debuted at number 78, and later peaked at number 42. "Tusa" also debuted at 56 and later peaked at number 41 on the Rolling Stone US Top 100 Songs chart on the week ending 30 January 2020, with 67,200 sales plus track-equivalent streams. The song peaked at number one in numerous other countries. The song is the longest-running number one single on the Argentina Hot 100, spending 25 weeks on the top of the chart.

In 2021, the single became the second-highest certified song in Mexico (AMPROFON) after "Con Calma", and the second-highest certified song by a female collaboration by the Latin division of the Recording Industry Association of America (RIAA), after "Mayores".

The song became the longest running number one single on the Argentina Hot 100, spending 25 consecutive weeks atop the charts. The song passed one billion streams on Spotify.

Music video
The music video for "Tusa" was directed by Mike Ho and was released on Karol G's YouTube channel on November 7, 2019.

Live performances
On December 8, 2019, Karol G premiered "Tusa" at Pixel 4's Motion Sense Concert Series. Karol G performed the song on The Tonight Show Starring Jimmy Fallon on 10 January 2020.

Awards and nominations

Charts

Weekly charts

Monthly charts

Year-end charts

Certifications

Release history

See also
List of Billboard number-one Latin songs of 2020
RIAA certification

References

2019 songs
2019 singles
Argentina Hot 100 number-one singles
Karol G songs
Nicki Minaj songs
Number-one singles in Spain
Spanish-language songs
Songs written by Karol G
Songs written by Nicki Minaj
Song recordings produced by Ovy on the Drums
Songs about heartache